The Blue Bird may refer to:

Media
 The Blue Bird (play) (L'Oiseau Bleu), a 1908 play by Maurice Maeterlinck, adapted numerous times for film and other media

Film Adaptations
 The Blue Bird (1910 film), a British silent film starring Pauline Gilmer and Olive Walter 
 The Blue Bird (1918 film), an American silent film directed by Maurice Tourneur 
 The Blue Bird (1940 film), American film, starring Shirley Temple
 The Blue Bird (1970 film), a Soviet animated film
 The Blue Bird (1976 film), a joint Soviet-American production directed by George Cukor
 Maeterlinck's Blue Bird: Tyltyl and Mytyl's Adventurous Journey, a 1980 Japanese animated TV series
 Blue Bird (2011 film), a Belgian film

Other productions
 "The Blue Bird" (fairy tale), by Madame d'Aulnoy
 A poem by Mary Coleridge titled L'Oiseau bleu, set to music by Charles Villiers Stanford
 L'oiseau bleu (opera), by Albert Wolff

Fine art
 L'Oiseau bleu (Metzinger) (The Blue Bird), a 1912–13 Cubist painting by Jean Metzinger

Music
 Blue Bird Inn, a jazz club in Detroit
 Beyond the Blue Bird, a 1990 Tommy Flanagan album

See also
 Bluebird (disambiguation)